Matthew Richard Bartkowski (born June 4, 1988) is an American professional ice hockey defenseman who is currently playing for the Rochester Americans of the American Hockey League (AHL).

Playing career

Florida Panthers
Bartkowski played high school hockey at Mt. Lebanon High School in suburban Pittsburgh. He was selected by the Florida Panthers in the 7th Round (190th overall) of the 2008 NHL Entry Draft following his final year in the USHL with the Lincoln Stars.

Boston Bruins
On March 3, 2010, the Panthers traded Bartkowski, along with Dennis Seidenberg, to the Boston Bruins for Byron Bitz, Craig Weller, and a 2nd round 2010 NHL Entry Draft choice. On April 29, 2010, Bartkowski was then signed to a two-year entry level contract with the Bruins.

On January 10, 2011, Bartkowski made his NHL debut for the Boston Bruins against his hometown team, the Pittsburgh Penguins. The Bruins went on to win the game 4-2, with Bartkowski registering two penalty minutes.

 
On June 15, 2011, the Boston Bruins won the Stanley Cup in game seven against the Vancouver Canucks. Bartkowski got to take part in the Bruins celebration and he also got to raise the Stanley Cup without playing a single playoff game with the Bruins. He did not, however, have his name engraved on the Stanley Cup, as a player to have his name inscribed must have played at least 41 games for the championship team during the regular season (provided the player remains with the team when they win the Cup) or played in at least one game of the Stanley Cup Finals.

On May 13, 2013, Bartkowski scored his first NHL goal, notching a playoff goal during Boston's Game seven win over the Toronto Maple Leafs in the Conference Quarterfinals of the 2013 Stanley Cup playoffs.

On July 14, 2014, Bartkowski signed a one-year extension with the Bruins worth $1.25 million, avoiding arbitration.

Vancouver Canucks
On July 1, 2015, Bartkowski signed a one-year deal with the Vancouver Canucks. On October 18, 2015, Bartkowski scored his first NHL regular season goal in a 2-1 loss to the Edmonton Oilers. The goal came in Bartkowski's 137th game played in the NHL.

Bartkowski appeared in a career-high 80 games for the Canucks during the 2015-16 season, scoring 18 points. However, the club chose not to re-sign him at season's end, making him an unrestricted free agent.

On September 16, 2016, Bartkowski was signed to a professional tryout by the Ottawa Senators. On October 5, he was released from his professional tryout with the Senators. He returned informally to the Bruins organization in accepting a professional try-out contract with former club, the Providence Bruins of the AHL to begin the 2016–17 season. In 34 games with Providence, Bartkowski added 2 goals and 10 points.

Calgary Flames
On February 15, 2017, Bartkowski was signed to a professional tryout with the Calgary Flames, reuniting him with head coach Glen Gulutzan, formerly an assistant in Vancouver. The next day, Bartkowski signed a two-year, two-way deal with the Flames.

Minnesota Wild
On July 1, 2018, as a free agent from the Flames, Bartkowski agreed to a one-year, two-way contract with the Minnesota Wild. He re-signed with the Wild on another one-year, two-way contract on June 11, 2019.

Later years
As a free agent after three seasons within the Wild organization, Bartkowski agreed to attend the Pittsburgh Penguins training camp on a professional tryout basis in preparation for the  season. After participating in pre-season, Bartkowski was released by Pittsburgh and signed to a one-year AHL contract with affiliate, the Wilkes-Barre/Scranton Penguins, on October 2, 2021. 

Following a full season with Wilkes-Barre/Scranton, Bartkowski for the second consecutive season went un-signed over the summer. He later joined the Rochester Americans in the AHL, affiliate to the Buffalo Sabres, agreeing to a professional tryout contract on October 29, 2022 to begin the 2022–23 season.

Career statistics

Awards and honors

References

External links

1988 births
Living people
American men's ice hockey defensemen
American people of Slavic descent
Boston Bruins players
Calgary Flames players
Florida Panthers draft picks
Ice hockey people from Pittsburgh
Iowa Wild players
Lincoln Stars players
Minnesota Wild players
Ohio State Buckeyes men's ice hockey players
Providence Bruins players
Rochester Americans players
Vancouver Canucks players
Wilkes-Barre/Scranton Penguins players